MidasWWW is one of the earliest (now discontinued) web browsers, developed at the Stanford Linear Accelerator Center (SLAC). It ran under Unix and OpenVMS. The last release was version 2.2. The 16 Nov 1992 sources were made available in June 2015 at GitHub.

References

External links
 The historic MidasWWW homepage at CERN

POSIX web browsers
1992 software
Discontinued web browsers